Joel S. Rice is an American actor and film producer. He made his film debut in the slasher film Final Exam (1981), and appeared in several television productions before later pursuing a career as a producer. He has produced over ninety television films, beginning 1993. Rice has been married since 1988 and has two daughters, Hannah Mae (born 1998) and Sarah Rose (born 2001).

Career
Originally from Boston, Massachusetts, Rice relocated to Los Angeles, California after obtaining a lead role in the horror film Final Exam (1981). He later became a social worker after leaving the entertainment industry, but returned to the film business as an executive producer, producing the television films Bonds of Love and Cries from the Heart, starring Patty Duke and Melissa Gilbert. He is well known for producing Hallmark movies and series.  His breakout project was the mini series Tut for Spike network, which starred Ben Kingsley and Avan Jogia.  He has executive-produced over 90 television films and productions since 1993. He is also the president of Muse Entertainment USA.

Filmography
Actor

Producer

References

External links

Year of birth missing (living people)
Living people
American film producers
American television producers